Frederick Hippert (4 October 1878 – 29 June 1940) was a South African cricketer. He played in seventeen first-class matches for Eastern Province between 1902/03 and 1910/11.

See also
 List of Eastern Province representative cricketers

References

External links
 

1878 births
1940 deaths
South African cricketers
Eastern Province cricketers
Cricketers from Port Elizabeth
Cricketers from Cape Colony